Charles J. "Iron Mike" Riordan (September 4, 1906 – February 14, 1989) was an American football fullback. He played college football for NYU and professional football in the National Football League (NFL) for the Staten Island Stapletons. He appeared in nine NFL games, six as a starter, during the 1929 season. He scored two touchdowns in a September 29 game against Millville.

References

1906 births
1989 deaths
American football fullbacks
NYU Violets football players
Staten Island Stapletons players
People from Bristol, Connecticut
Players of American football from Connecticut